The Usury Act 1660 was an Act of the Parliament of England (12 Cha. 2. c. 13) with the long title "An Act for restraining the taking of Excessive Usury".

The purpose of the Act was to reduce the maximum interest rate from 8% (imposed in 1624 by the Usury Act 1623 (21 Jas. 1, c. 17)) to 6%. The legislation had been enacted in 1651 under the Commonwealth, but this Act was passed to confer legality on the measure following the Restoration of Charles II.

It was amended by the Usury Act 1714 (13 Ann., c. 15), which further reduced the interest rate to 5%; the Usury Act 1840 (3 & 4 Vict., c. 83); the Usury Act 1841 (4 & 5 Vict., c. 54); the Usury Act 1843 (6 & 7 Vict., c. 45); the Usury Act 1845 (8 & 9 Vict., c. 102); and the Usury Act 1850 (13 & 14 Vict., c. 56). It was repealed by section 1 of the Usury Laws Repeal Act 1854 (17 & 18 Vict., c. 90); the last Act is also known as An Act to repeal the Laws relating to Usury and to the Enrolment of Annuities.

References

1660 in law
1660 in England
Acts of the Parliament of England
Usury